Farris Field is the home stadium for the Division I (NCAA) Central Arkansas Sugar Bears softball team. Located next to the Bill Stephens Track/Soccer Complex on the campus of the University of Central Arkansas, the stadium features seating for 1,000 fans.  Included in the 1,000 seat capacity is bleacher seating for 500.  An outfield grass berm can accommodate an additional 500 fans.  The stadium has field lighting, bullpens, dugouts, a press box, and an electronic scoreboard.  Beyond the left field fence are locker rooms and batting cages.

Attendance

Below is a list of Farris Field's 10 best-attended games.

Top 10 attendance marks

As of the 2013 season.

Tournaments
 AHSCA All-Star Week Softball All-Star games - On June 6, 2012, the Arkansas Activities Association voted to hold all-star events on the campus of Central Arkansas from 2013 to 2017.  Farris Field is the home of the softball all-star game.
 UCA Invitational Tournament - Farris Field has been the home of several early season softball tournaments.

References

External links
 Sugar Bears Softball Official Website

Central Arkansas Sugar Bears softball
College softball venues in the United States